The RD-0236 (GRAU Index 15D114) is a liquid rocket vernier engine, burning N2O4 and UDMH in the gas generator cycle. It is used along the RD-0235 main engine on the UTTKh second stage, which was featured in the UR-100N ICBM as well as the Strela and Rokot launch vehicles derived from it. Its function is to supply thrust vector control by gimbaling each of its four nozzles in a plane. While the engine is out of production, the ICBM as well as  Strela remain operational as of 2015. The Rokot launch vehicle conducted its final launch before retirement in December 2019.

See also

UR-100N - ICBM for which this engine was originally developed for.
Rokot - launch vehicle that is a repurposed UR-100N.
Strela - launch vehicle that is a repurposed UR-100N.
Rocket engine using liquid fuel

References

External links 
 KbKhA official information on the engine. (Archived)
 Encyclopedia Astronautica information on the propulsion module. (Archived)

Rocket engines of the Soviet Union
Rocket engines using hypergolic propellant
Rocket engines using the gas-generator cycle
KBKhA rocket engines